The 1949 France rugby union tour of Argentina was a series of rugby union matches played by the France national team in Argentina. It was the first official visit of a European team in South America.

Between the two test match was played an exhibition match between two mixed teams both formed of Argentinian and French Team. The "Blancos" (White) won against "Colorados" (Red) (24–14). Many referee were British people who lived in Argentina.

Touring party
Manager: R. Crabos
Assistant manager: A. Jauréguy
Captain: G. Basquet

Players 

 Pierre Aristouy
 Yves Bergougnan
 Noel Baudr
 Eugene Buzy
 Lucien Caron
 Francis Desclaux
 Gerard Dufau
 Pierre Dizabo
 Henri Dutrain
 Robert Geneste
 Marcel Jol
 Robert Lacrampe
 Jean Lassegue
 Paul Lasaosa
 Jean Matheu
 Alban Moga
 Andre Moga
 Lucien Martin
 Jean Prat
 Michel Pomathios
 Robert Soro
 Maurice Terreau

Match summary 
Complete list of matches played by France in Argentina:

 Test matches

Notes

Match details

Provincia: R. del Molino Torres, E. Caffarone, A. Dones, A. Palma, L. Ehrman, R. Giles, G. Ehrman, N_ Tompkins, M. Sarandón, R. Allen, E. Domínguez, A. Castelnuovo, J. Petrone, C. Swain, R. Follet.
 France: N. Baudry, M. Pomathios, P. Dizabo, J. Lassegue, G. Dufau, Y. Bergougnan, Prat, G. Basquet, J. Matheu, J. Soro, Al. Moga, L. Caron, M. Jol, E. Buzy.

CASI–SIC: R. del Molino Torres, R. Gil, J. M. Belgrano, F. Guastavino, A. Arana, R. Ochoa, M. de las Carreras, M. Villalonga, L. Allen, M. Sarandón, H, Conti, J. Morganti, C. Rolón, C. Taccioli, C. Orti.
France: N. Baudry, M. Pomathios, F. Dizabo, F. Desclaux, R. Geneste, M. Terreau, P. Lasaosa, Prat, A. Moga, R. Lacrampe, R. Soro, Al. Moga, L. Caron, L. Martín, P. Aristouy.

Club Fundadores: E. Moore, W. Chiswell, J. Hardie, W. Mc Minn, R. Gilderdale, P. Macadam, J. Pow, D. Hughes, A. Phillips, E. Lucotti, A. Bori, G. Daw, G. Bridger, G. Hardie, E. Stocks.
France: N. Baudry; M. Pomathios, F. Desclaux, R. Geneste; J. Lassegue, "M. Terreau, Y. Bergougnan, R. Lacrampe, G. Basquet, J. Matheu, R. Soro, Al. Moga, E. Buzy, M. Jol, L. Caron.

La Plata: P. Garese, M.  Morón, C. A. Mercader, R. Ferrando, R. Méndez, J. Ocampo, H. Dutil, L. Saraví, E. Weber, R. Arce, M. Galván, R. Gitard, R. Gorostiaga, H. Nocetti, P. Oppici.
France: N. Baudry, R. Geneste, H. Dutrain, M. Terreau, J. Lassegue, G. Dufau, P. Lasaosa, J. Matheu, An. Moga, R. Lacrampe, Al. Moga, R. Soro, P. Aristouy, L. Martin, E. Buzy.

Pucará: G. Niveiro, P. Bereciartúa, A. Palma, J. C. de Pablo, L. Ehrman, R. E. Giles, G. Ehrman, H. de Pablo, D. Bereciartúa, E. Domínguez, A. Fernández, A. Barnadas, L. Carratelli, E. Dacharry, J. C. Petrone.
|line-up2=France: F. Desclaux, J. Lassegue, H. Dutrain, P. Dizabo, R. Geneste, M. Terreau, Y. Bergougnan, J. Matheu, G. Basquet, G. Dufau, Al. Moga, R. Soro, E. Buzy, M. Jol, L. Caron.

Capital:  J. Genoud, 'W. Chiswell, J. Hardie, W. Mc Minn, R. Gilderdale, P. Macadam, C. Benítez Cruz, D. Hughes, A. Phillips, B. Grigolon, L. Maurette, A. Bori, C. Peterson, E. Verzoletto, G. Hardie.
France: : N. Baudry, H. Dutrain, M. Terreau, F. Desclaux, J. Lassegue, G. Dufau, Y. Bergougnan, Prat, J. Matheu, R. Soro, Al. Moga, L. Caron, M. Jol, E. Buzy.

Estudiantes (P):  M. Avellaneda, R. Castello, F. Luján, O. Gomes, F. Rodríguez Gurruchaga, F. García, F. Torné, M. Benavente, F. Fonseca, C. Ferrer, R. Caino, R. Arcioni, F. Borches, C. Rabuffetti, D. Kaufman.
France: : F. Desclaux, R. Geneste, M Terreau, H. Dutrain, J. Lassegue, N. Baudry, G. Dufau, Prat, An. Moga, R. Lacrampe, Al. Moga, R. Soro, L. Caron, J. Matheu, P. Aristouy.

First test

Second test

Exhibition Match 
An Exhibition match was played between the two test match. Two teams were arranged, both with some French and Argentinian players. The "Blancos" ("Whites"), won against "Colorados" ("Coloreds")

Blancos J. Prat, H. Dutrain, R. Geneste, F: Desclaux; M. Pomathios, G. Dufau, P. Lasaosa, H. Caño (Curu¬paytí), L. Allen (C.A.S.I.), B. Grigolon (Hindú), W. Beckwith (San Martín), H. Conti (S.I.C.), A. Guyot (C.A.S.I.), E. Dacharry (Pucará), C. Peterson (Bs. As.).
Colorados: : M. Avellaneda (Estudiantes), R. Gilder¬dale (Bs. As.), E. Fernández del Casol (C.U.B.A.), A. Jones (Old G's), C. Di Pasquo (Curupaytí), M. Fellner (C.U.B.A.), C. Benítez Cruz (C.U.B.A.), R. Lacrampe, An. Moga, J. Matheu, R. Soro, Al. Moga, E. Buzy, R. Martin, P. Aristouy.

References 

France tour
Rugby union tours of Argentina
France national rugby union team tours
rugby
tour